"Happiness (Rotting My Brain)" is a song by Australian rock band Regurgitator. The song was released in July 1999 as the lead single from the band's third studio album ...art. The single peaked at number 44 in Australia and 16 in New Zealand. It was ranked at number 62 on Triple J's Hottest 100 in 1999. The Paul Butler and Scott Walton-directed music video was nominated for Best Video at the ARIA Music Awards of 2000.

Track listing

Charts

Release history

References

 

1999 singles
1999 songs
Regurgitator songs
Song recordings produced by Magoo (Australian producer)
Songs written by Quan Yeomans